Bexleyheath railway station is in the London Borough of Bexley in south east London, and is in Travelcard Zone 5. The station, and all trains serving it, is operated by Southeastern. There are ticket barriers at both entrances.

Services 

The typical off-peak service in trains per hour is:
 2 tph to 
 2 tph to London Cannon Street
 2 tph to 

During the peak hours, the station is served by an additional half-hourly service between Dartford and London Charing Cross.

Connections
London Buses routes 422, B11, B12 and B15 serve the station.

References

External links

Railway stations in the London Borough of Bexley
Former South Eastern Railway (UK) stations
Railway stations in Great Britain opened in 1895
Railway stations served by Southeastern
Railway station